The water polo tournament at the 2022 Mediterranean Games in Oran took place between 24 and 30 June at the Oran Olympic Swimming Pool. The competition was held only for men's teams.

Medal summary

Events

Participating teams

Preliminary round
All times are local (UTC+1).

Group A

Group B

Final round

Bracket

Semifinals

Seventh place game

Fifth place game

Bronze medal game

Gold medal game

Final standings

References

External links
Official site
Results book

Sports at the 2022 Mediterranean Games
2022
Mediterranean Games
Mediterranean Games